Halgerda formosa is a species of sea slug, a dorid nudibranch, shell-less marine gastropod mollusks in the family Discodorididae.

Distribution
This species was described from a specimen collected on the island of Réunion, Indian Ocean. It has subsequently been rediscovered there and on Mauritius.

References

Discodorididae
Gastropods described in 1880